Jehandad Khan (d. 1914) was an Afghan rebel emir who ruled only in Khost. He was born as a member of the Ghilzai tribe, and spent most of his life as a chieftain. After start of the Khost rebellion on 2 May 1912, he briefly laid claim to the Afghan throne in opposition to Habibullah Khan, but an offensive by Muhammad Nadir Khan forced him to flee to the British Raj by the end of the same month. When Jehandad arrived in India, he was given the option of immediately returning to Afghanistan or staying in India, and he chose the latter. He then appealed to the British authorities for an intervention in Afghanistan to aid the rebellion, but was unsuccessful. Later in 1912, Jehandad managed to return to Afghanistan, where he was apprehended, put on trial, sentenced to death and finally executed by a firing squad in 1914.

References 

Year of birth missing
1914 deaths
20th-century Afghan monarchs
Emirs of Afghanistan
Usurpers
People executed by Afghanistan by firing squad
1912 in Afghanistan
20th-century Afghan politicians
20th-century executions by Afghanistan
Executed monarchs
Afghan rebels
Afghan expatriates in India